Raymond Byrom (2 January 1935 – 6 January 2020) was an English professional footballer who played as an outside left in the Football League.

Career
Born in Blackburn, Lancashire, Byrom started his career in the reserve side at hometown club Blackburn Rovers before signing for Football League Third Division North side Accrington Stanley in January 1956. He spent two years at Accrington and was part of the side that gained promotion to the Third Division in 1957, however he only made eleven games in all competitions. In December 1958, he signed for Fourth Division side Bradford (Park Avenue), following manager Walter Galbraith to the West Yorkshire club. He played in seventy league games for Bradford before sustaining a broken leg in a fixture in August 1960, which eventually finished his career.

Personal life
He settled in nearby Oswaldtwistle and following his retirement from professional football, Byrom started working for a motor supplies company in Blackburn before setting up his own business in 1972, Ray's Garage Supplies, with his wife Agnes. His son, Alan, also played for Accrington Stanley in non-league, as did his grandson, Joel, who featured for them in League Two. He died on 6 January 2020 following a short spell in hospital.

Career statistics

References

1935 births
2020 deaths
Footballers from Blackburn
English footballers
Bradford (Park Avenue) A.F.C. players
Accrington Stanley F.C. (1891) players
English Football League players
Association football outside forwards